Harold Lloyd Stringert (born January 5, 1952) is a former professional American football cornerback in the National Football League.  He played six seasons for the San Diego Chargers and played college football for both Willamette University and the University of Hawaii.

References

1952 births
Living people
Players of American football from Honolulu
American football cornerbacks
Hawaii Rainbow Warriors football players
San Diego Chargers players
Willamette Bearcats football players